Richard Charles Hunter (December 3, 1884January 23, 1941) was an American attorney and Democratic politician from Nebraska. He was most prominent for his service as a United States Senator (1934-1935) and as Nebraska's state attorney general (1937-1939).

Biography
Hunter was born in West Point, Nebraska on December 3, 1884, the son of Jabez Richard Hunter and Sarah Frances (Olmstead) Hunter.  His family moved to Omaha, Nebraska in 1885, and Hunter attended the Omaha public schools and graduated from Omaha High School in 1904.

He graduated from the University of Nebraska-Lincoln with a Bachelor of Arts degree in 1909.  He attended Harvard Law School and received his LL.B. degree from Columbia Law School in 1911.  Hunter was a member of Columbia's debate team in 1911, and was a member of the Delta Sigma Rho and Sigma Alpha Epsilon fraternities.

Career
Hunter was admission to the bar and began to practice in Lincoln, Nebraska.  He returned to Omaha in 1912, where he continued to practice law.

He served in the Nebraska House of Representatives and as judge of Omaha's Municipal Court from 1915 to 1917.  He ran unsuccessfully for state Attorney General in 1920 and state Railway Commissioner in 1928.

On November 6, 1934 Hunter was appointed to the United States Senate to complete the term of Robert B. Howell, who had died in office.  He served until January 3, 1935 and was not a candidate for a full term.  In 1936, he was the successful Democratic nominee for Nebraska Attorney General, and served from 1937 to 1939.

Death and burial
He died in Tucson, Arizona on January 23, 1941.  He was buried at West Lawn Memorial Park in Omaha.

Family
On April 22, 1908, Hunter married Viletta G. Taylor (1887-1937).  They had no children.

References

Sources

Books

Newspapers

External links
 
 
 "Unsworn Senators", Time, January 14, 1935. Article about Hunter and Rush D. Holt Sr.

1884 births
1941 deaths
University of Nebraska–Lincoln alumni
Harvard Law School alumni
Democratic Party members of the Nebraska House of Representatives
Nebraska state court judges
Nebraska Attorneys General
Politicians from Omaha, Nebraska
Columbia Law School alumni
Democratic Party United States senators from Nebraska
20th-century American judges
Lawyers from Omaha, Nebraska
People from West Point, Nebraska
20th-century American politicians
20th-century American lawyers